The 1982 Bonn summit was the 6th NATO summit bringing the leaders of member nations together at the same time. The formal sessions and informal meetings in Bonn took place on 10 June 1982. This event was only the fifth meeting of the NATO heads of state following the ceremonial signing of the North Atlantic Treaty on 4 April 1949. When the summit was held, there were sixteen members of NATO.

Background
In this period, the organization faced unresolved questions concerned whether a new generation of leaders would be as committed to NATO as their predecessors had been. The Bonn Summit addressed many issues and discussed many topics. Most notable of these topics was the accession of Spain to NATO, as the summit was held years after the fall of Francisco Franco. The summit also voiced concern to the perceived threat the Soviet Union posed to members of NATO.

See also
 EU summit
 G8 summit

Notes

References
 Thomas, Ian Q.R. (1997). The promise of alliance: NATO and the political imagination. Lanham: Rowman & Littlefield. ;

External links
 NATO update, 1982

1982 in politics
Summit of 1982
1982 Bonn summit
Diplomatic conferences in Germany
20th-century diplomatic conferences
1982 conferences
1982 in international relations
1982 in West Germany
Germany and NATO
June 1982 events in Europe